Yury Davidovich Levitansky (January 22, 1922, Kozelets, Chernigov Oblast, Ukrainian SSR —  January 25, 1996, Moscow, Russia) was a Russian- language poet and translator from the USSR, a master of lyrical parody of genres, and Laureate of the State Prize of the Russian Federation in the field of literature and art in 1994.

Levitansky fought in the Great Patriotic War. Afterwards, his first collection of poems was released in 1948 in Irkutsk. In the years 1955-1957 Levitansky studied in the Higher literary courses at Maxim Gorky Literature Institute. In 1957, he became a member of the Writers' Union. In 1963 he published a collection of poems called Earthly Heaven, which sprung him into fame as an author.

Many of Levitansky's poems were set to music, sung and performed by popular bards.  Some of these songs are found in the movies Moscow Does Not Believe in Tears and Chivalric Romance.

In 1993 he signed the Letter of Forty-Two.

In 1995, at the ceremony of the aforementioned State Prize, Levitansky appealed to then Russian President Boris Yeltsin to halt the First Chechen War.

References

External links
 
 Cтихи Юpия Лeвитанскoгo

1922 births
1996 deaths
Ukrainian Jews
Russian-language poets
Soviet poets
Soviet male writers
20th-century Russian male writers
Russian male poets
Soviet translators
20th-century Russian translators
State Prize of the Russian Federation laureates
Ukrainian parodists
Russian parodists
Writers from Donetsk
Burials at Vagankovo Cemetery